The 1925 North Tajima earthquake occurred on May 23, 1925 at Toyooka, Hyōgo in Japan.

Overview 
This earthquake's epicenter was in the Maruyama River estuary.

According to the Japanese government's official report, there were 428 fatalities, 1,016 injuries, 7,863 buildings destroyed, and 45,659 houses damaged by collapse or fire. This quake caused extensive damage to the town of Toyooka and the Maruyama River area.

Just before the shaking could be felt, a sound like a cannon was reportedly heard intermittently from the direction of the estuary near the Maruyama River. During the earthquake, the ground in the town of Tokyooka experienced strong seismic vibrations for 16 seconds.

As most of the buildings of the time were wooden, many of them were destroyed at once during the initial earthquake. In the fire that broke out subsequently, half of Toyooka was burned down, with many deaths resulting (a reported 8% of the town's population.) Two hundred and seventy-two deaths were confirmed to have occurred in the Kinosaki area.

See also 
 List of earthquakes in 1923
 List of earthquakes in Japan

References

External links 

 北但大震災の概要  - Toyooka city

Earthquakes of the Taishō period
1925 earthquakes
1925 in Japan
History of Hyōgo Prefecture
May 1925 events
1925 disasters in Japan